Franklin and the Turtle Lake Treasure (Franklin et le trésor du lac in France and Benjamin et le Trésor du lac in Canadian French) is a children's animated adventure drama film released on September 6, 2006, based on the TV series Franklin. It was the first Franklin film shown in theaters in Canada and France, as well as the last production in the Franklin series to be traditionally animated.

The events of this film focus around Franklin's Granny falling ill during a visit from Franklin's Aunt Lucy, who is an archaeologist. Aunt Lucy knows of a special talisman that may cure the illness, so she joins Franklin on a quest to find it, along with his friends Bear, Beaver, and Snail. But they are also accompanied by Aunt Lucy's goddaughter, Samantha "Sam", and her personality clashes with Franklin.

The film was released direct-to-video in the United States, by HBO and has had occasional TV airings on Nick Jr. since then. Writer John van Bruggen, stated "this film will take Franklin on a much greater adventure than any of the past Franklin films, including Franklin and the Green Knight." The film was written by John van Bruggen and directed by Dominique Monfrey; it was distributed by Mars Distribution. StudioCanal controlled international distribution. This film has also been listed under the working titles "Franklin and the Secret Talisman" and "Franklin and Granny's Secret".

It also serves as the series finale to the 1997 series, as no new episodes were produced after the film was released. This was Patricia Gage's final performance before she died four years later in 2010.

Plot

The film opens with black and white and a young female turtle with glasses burying a green box. The scene zooms out to a turtle shaped lake, then we see a picture of it as we hear a fire and someone shouting "Mother! Father!" before it then perishes on Granny Turtle, who wakes from a bad dream, and sighs sadly. The scene then pulls us to Franklin, Beaver and Snail playing pirates, and they were about to go to a tree with an X. Just as they were about head towards there, Bear appears playing the villainous captain and Franklin defeats him. After that, the four went home. Franklin and Snail walk by Franklin's Aunt Lucy's place and notice the door was open. They went inside to see if Aunt Lucy was home, but instead someone in a mask scares them off and they run away. As they run off, the someone in behind the mask reveals to be a female turtle with a pink bonnet on the head. two run, where Franklin's parents and sister Harriet get a message of Lucy, with no post or stamp. When Franklin revels what happened, Mr. Turtle soon gets the answers and they walk around the house, where Lucy appears to be. Lucy was at Granny Turtle's (hers and Mr. Turtle's mother) and promised to invite the turtles over.

When Franklin tells her about the monster at her place, Lucy thinks it's her goddaughter. When the turtles arrive at Granny's place, who is happy to see them here, Lucy is in the backyard, with her goddaughter who reveals to be the turtle with pink bonnet, named Samantha (or "Sam"). The two aren't getting along very well and despite trying to be to nice to each other, their personality clashes keep getting the best of them. Later the next day, Bear, Beaver, and Snail wait for Franklin to play pirates again, when they see him with a bouquet of flowers. They decide to follow to see what's up. When they arrive, they meet Samantha, who thinks pirate games are for little kids, until Aunt Lucy appears as a pirate. As Sam is still not interested, Lucy decides to show her a map that shows real treasure: Granny's box of memories. Franklin and Sam decided to meet Granny to talk to her about the box. Granny flashes back to when she was just a child, revealing to be the turtle we had seen at the beginning of the film. She lived in Turtle Lake. She spent mornings fishing with her father and afternoons picking berries with her mother. She found a secret hiding place and stayed there for hours and hours. Then, she buried her valuables inside a painted tin box in the ground to keep and remember, but she never got the chance to open it again. A few nights after she buried it, her parents let her sleep outside in a tent when a forest fire started and burned her tent and was about to damage her house. She manages to escape on the lake with a boat when the rain started. The next morning, her house was destroyed, the location of the time capsule was obscured, and the fire burned and her parents died. She went to live with her aunt's family and hadn't been back ever since.

Interested by her past, Franklin and Samantha decided to check on memories from Mr. Turtle and Lucy's past. Later, the turtles get a call from Lucy that Granny is sick, and they decided to check on her. When Mr. and Mrs. Turtle leave the room, Franklin put his face in the pillow and starts to cry. But Harriet,in a change of heart,saw Franklin cry and comforts him. Thinking that the box may be their only hope, Franklin, Sam, Lucy, Beaver, Bear, and Snail decide to head to Granny's old ruined home. During the adventure, Sam pulls a dirty trick by placing a rock in Beaver's backpack, causing her to slow down, until she finds out when she looks inside. She is not impressed by this joke and does not think it is funny. Suddenly, a flock of butterflies appears and they follow them, where they meet an old wise turtle, who gives an item, in which Granny also has it was imminently given back. Next day, they meet Little Crow, an orphan bird, who shows them the place with box use to be, revealing to be taken. Later, after placing flowers over Granny's house, they head out where Little Crow takes Snail to where three baby birds are.

Meanwhile, Bear, Beaver and Lucy try look for the two turtles, who went to looking for Snail, and find an arrow Sam left for them to follow. While trying catch up get, Franklin and Sam's personality clashes happen again, until Little Crow, crying because the chicks wouldn't let him play with Snail (or "Pretty Shell" as he would call him), wanting to keep him to themselves. As they climb to reach to Snail, Samantha's hand slips, causing her to fall, but is saved by Franklin. They decided to rest rock that's safer not to fall. While waiting, the two turtles apologize for what they said and did to each other, admitting that their personality clashes had gotten the best of them. They soon reach the top and try to save Snail, but chicks refuse to let them take Snail. Little Crow manages to save Snail, but gets into a fight with the chicks, causing her to throw Snail off the nest. Sam saves her, but they all fall when the mother of the chicks appear and save them from falling to certain death. Lucy, Bear, and Beaver arrive and help them all down. They decided to let Little Crow be with the Mother Hawk, as they set off.

They soon arrive at a chasm, where they hear a voice, and help him out. The voice reveals to be Grizzly and he brings them to his home. Back at Granny's, Mr. and Mrs. Turtle made sure Granny's alive. It later reveals that Grizzly dug Granny's box out when he was digging. They thank him and leave for home, with Grizzly giving them his canoe as shortcut. They soon see Little Crow flying with Mother Hawk, and the wise old turtle. They make it back just in time. They give her the item, her dad's fishing hook, a picture of her house she drew and a sealed picture of her as an infant with her parents. She smiles as she finally recovers. Later that evening, the family has picnic and they enjoy rest of evening together. The two turtles and Harriet dance to Granny's song, and reveal it's back to school and they'll both miss each other, hoping to see each other again real soon. As a reminder of their summer, Franklin gives Sam Granny's map and Samantha promises to never forget this summer as she kisses Franklin. The film ends with Aunt Lucy saying that life is full of surprises.

During the first half of the credits, we see several pictures hung in a room, with it ending with the picture of Granny Turtle as an infant with her parents.

Cast 
Cameron Ansell as Franklin
Mark McMulkin as Bear
Leah Cudmore as Beaver
Tajja Isen as Samantha
 Isen also voices a Younger version of Granny Turtle in the flashback scenes
Kristen Bone as Snail
Doug Murray as Grizzly
 Corinne Conley as Granny Turtle
Shauna Black as Aunt Lucy
Hanna Endicott-Douglas as Little Crow
Elizabeth Saunders as Mrs. Turtle
Richard Newman as Mr. Turtle
Bryn McAuley as Harriet
Patricia Gage as The Old Turtle
Mari Trainor as Dr. Bear
Helen Taylor as Mrs. Falcon
 Isaac Pustil, Emma Pustil, and Joshua Isen as the Baby Chicks

Versions
Franklin and the Turtle Lake Treasure is available in two versions, French and English, both of which are in different case covers. The film's French title is Franklin et le trésor du lac. The film was released in Canadian & French theaters in 2006.

On May 22, 2007, HBO Video released the film on DVD in the United States, where it was given a G rating from the MPAA, despite not getting theatrically released in the US.

References

External links

 

2006 films
2006 animated films
2000s children's animated films
Canadian children's animated films
Canadian animated feature films
French children's films
2000s French animated films
Television series finales
Franklin the Turtle (books)
Animated films based on children's books
Animated films based on animated series
Films about turtles
Animated films about turtles
Animated films about friendship
Nelvana films
StudioCanal films
StudioCanal animated films
2000s American films
2000s Canadian films
2000s British films